Thomas Bonnevie (12 September 1879 – 19 May 1960) was a Norwegian Supreme Court justice.

Biography
Bonnevie was born at  Trondheim, Norway. He was a son of Member of Parliament and cabinet minister Jacob Aall Bonnevie (1838–1904) and Anne Johanne Daae (1839–1876). He was also the brother of professor Kristine Bonnevie (1872–1948) and jurist Carl Bonnevie (1881-1972). His sister Sofie Honoria Bonnevie (1864–1928), married Norwegian physicist and meteorologist Vilhelm Bjerknes. Bonnevie was married to Margarete Bonnevie, who was President of the Norwegian Association for Women's Rights; he was also himself a member of the association.

Thomas Bonnevie earned the cand.jur. degree in 1902 at the Royal Frederick University, and became a barrister (with the right to appear before the Supreme Court) in 1910. He was a partner with Harald Nørregaard (1864-1938) in the law firm Nørregaard & Bonnevie until his appointment as  Supreme Court justice  to the Supreme Court of Norway in 1922. Thomas Bonnevie also promoted Gustav Vigeland's art and the construction of the sculpture arrangement in Frogner Park.

In 1947, Bonnevie published the book Høyesterett og riksråds-forhandlingene (Oslo: Dahl, Mathisen, 1947).

References

1879 births
1960 deaths
People from Trondheim
University of Oslo alumni
20th-century Norwegian judges
Norwegian legal writers
Supreme Court of Norway justices
Norwegian people of French descent
Thomas
Norwegian Association for Women's Rights people